You+Me is a Canadian-American folk music duo consisting of singers and songwriters Dallas Green, better known as City and Colour, and Alecia Moore, better known as Pink. Their debut album, entitled Rose Ave., was released on October 14, 2014, by RCA Records. The first promotional single from the album, "You and Me", premiered with a lyric video on their Vevo channel on September 8, 2014.

History

Background
Moore and Green met through mutual friends several years prior to their collaboration in 2014. The first time they sang together Green had asked Moore to sing with him at one of his shows. They remained friends and Green opened several shows for Moore in the U.K. Moore had considered singing acoustic ballads, and as friends the two had considered collaborating for several years. In March 2014, their schedules allowed them to get together and compose original songs. They had written musical nuggets in advance, and their debut album Rose Ave. took shape within a week. The artists attributed their quick progress to the freedom from usual production pressures and the joy of making music together. The name of the duo, You+Me, is based on the two friends wanting to sing together.

Green recalls how the collaboration came about: "Alecia and I had talked about (working together) for a long time — not about making a record, but the idea of singing together and trying to write a song. (...) When we had the time to do it, that really lit a fire of creativity because it was something different. The idea of collaborating with a female voice and a different writer was what I needed, I guess, to create a bunch of new songs."

Rose Ave.
The duo's debut album Rose Ave. was released on October 14, 2014. The work was initiated and produced by Moore and Green. They had considered releasing the music independently; however, in order to reach a large audience and for legal concerns the album was released through Moore's label RCA Records. The album charted at number one in Canada and at number four in the United States, the home countries of the artists.

Possible second album 
In an interview from June 2021, Green stated that he had recently written "almost a whole new record" for You+Me.

Discography

Albums

Singles

References

External links

American indie folk groups
Musical groups established in 2014
Pink (singer)
RCA Records artists
Folk music supergroups
Canadian indie folk groups
2014 establishments in California